Tayuman station is an elevated Manila Light Rail Transit (LRT) station situated on Line 1. The station serves Santa Cruz in Manila and is located at the intersection of Rizal Avenue and Tayuman Street. The station is named after Tayuman Street.

Tayuman station serves as the eighth station for Line 1 trains headed to Baclaran, the thirteenth station for trains headed to Roosevelt, and is one of the five Line 1 stations serving Santa Cruz district, the others being Blumentritt, Bambang, Doroteo Jose, and Carriedo.

Transportation links
Like its neighbor Blumentritt, commuters can take the many jeepneys or taxis to Tayuman station.

Because of its proximity to SM City San Lazaro, jeepneys and taxis can also take commuters to and from the station going to the mall.

See also
List of rail transit stations in Metro Manila
Manila Light Rail Transit System

Manila Light Rail Transit System stations
Railway stations opened in 1985
Buildings and structures in Santa Cruz, Manila
1985 establishments in the Philippines